An Chang-ryon is a North Korean politician. He served as a delegate to the Supreme People's Assembly during its 9th (1990), 10th (1998), and 11th (2003) sessions.

See also
 Politics of North Korea
 List of Koreans

References
 Yonhap News Agency.  "Who's who in North Korea," pp. 787–812 in 

Living people
Members of the Supreme People's Assembly
Year of birth missing (living people)